San Bruno station is a Caltrain station located in San Bruno, California. The station is located just northeast of downtown San Bruno, above the intersection of San Mateo and San Bruno Avenues, adjacent to Artichoke Joe's Casino.

History

The first Southern Pacific Railroad station in San Bruno was located off Huntington Avenue (which parallels the railroad) at Euclid Avenue. It was moved one block south to San Bruno Avenue and expanded in 1916. The second story was removed in 1953. A new station with small concrete and wood shelters opened further south at Sylvan Avenue in 1963, and the old depot was demolished that September.

The construction of the BART extension to San Francisco International Airport and Millbrae required the construction of a BART tunnel under downtown San Bruno. The 1963-opened station was demolished in 1998; in April 1999, the Caltrain stop was moved to a temporary location under the I-380 overpass near the Tanforan Shopping Center to the north. A rebuilt station opened at the Sylvan Avenue site in 2003.

In 2010, construction began on the San Bruno Grade Separation Project, which included new elevated tracks and a new elevated station at San Bruno Avenue. In October 2010, trains began stopping at a temporary station at Georgia Avenue. Trains began using the new elevated tracks on May 26, 2013, and the new station opened on April 1, 2014.

The station platforms are planned to be lengthened to accommodate through-running California High-Speed Rail service.

References

External links

Caltrain – San Bruno

Caltrain stations in San Mateo County, California
San Bruno, California
San Francisco Bay Trail
Railway stations in the United States opened in 1962
1962 establishments in California
Former Southern Pacific Railroad stations in California